Yasnaya Polyana is a rural locality (a settlement) in Pevomaysky Selsoviet, Biysky District, Altai Krai, Russia. The population was 374 as of 2013. There are 4 streets.

Geography 
Yasnaya Polyana is located 25 km northeast of Biysk (the district's administrative centre) by road. Beryozovaya Gorka is the nearest rural locality.

References 

Rural localities in Biysky District